"Bucktown" is a song by American hip hop duo Smif-N-Wessun from their debut studio album Dah Shinin'. It was released in 1994 via Wreck/Nervous Records as the lead single from the album. Recording sessions took place at D&D Studios in New York. Production was handled by DJ Evil Dee and Mr. Walt, containing a sample from Jack Bruce's version of "Born to be Blue". The single peaked at number 93 on the US Billboard Hot 100.

Track listing

Personnel
Darrell A. Yates Jr. – main artist, vocals
Tekomin B. Williams – main artist, vocals
Ewart C. Dewgarde – producer, mixing
Walter V. Dewgarde – producer, mixing, executive producer
Drew "Dru-Ha" Friedman – executive producer
Kieran Mayo – engineering
Leo "Swift" Morris – engineering

Charts

References

External links

1994 songs
1994 debut singles